Stephen L. Goldfinch (born November 19, 1982) is an American politician. He is a member of the South Carolina Senate from the 34th District, serving since 2016. He is a member of the Republican party.

References

Living people
1982 births
Republican Party South Carolina state senators
21st-century American politicians
People from Conway, South Carolina
The Citadel, The Military College of South Carolina alumni